Bondville is an unincorporated village in the town of Winhall, Bennington County, Vermont, United States. Bondville has a post office with ZIP code 05340, which opened on May 23, 1850.

Bondville also hosts the smallest and oldest consecutive running fair in Vermont. The first year dating back to 1797.

References

Unincorporated communities in Bennington County, Vermont
Unincorporated communities in Vermont